Chiara Vannucci (born 25 October 1993) is an Italian racing cyclist. She competed in the 2013 UCI women's team time trial in Florence.

Major results
2012
3rd Team Pursuit, UEC European U23 Track Championships (with Elena Cecchini, Maria Giulia Confalonieri and Giulia Donato)
2013
3rd Team Pursuit, UEC European U23 Track Championships (with Beatrice Bartelloni, Elena Cecchini and Maria Giulia Confalonieri)

References

External links
 

1993 births
Living people
Italian female cyclists
Cyclists from Milan